Poke may refer to:

Arts, entertainment, and media
 Poke (Ender's Game), a fictional character
 Poke (game), a two-player card game
 Poke, a fictional bar owner in the television series Treme
 The Poke, a British satirical website

Food
 Poke (confectionery), a dry, cone-shaped pastry
 Poke (Hawaiian dish), originating in Hawaii
 Poke (pudding), originating in the Cook Islands

Other uses
 PEEK and POKE, BASIC commands
 Poke bonnet, a type of headwear
 Poke (Facebook), a Facebook feature
 Poke (Oklahoma State University), a nickname for an Oklahoma State Cowboys athlete
 Poke (surname)
 Poke language, a Soko–Kele language spoken by the Topoke people
 Virginia poke or pokeweed, a herbaceous perennial plant

See also

 Pig in a poke
 Poke salad (disambiguation)